The 2019–20 Vijay Hazare Trophy was the 18th season of the Vijay Hazare Trophy, a List A cricket tournament in India. It took place in September and October 2019, after the Duleep Trophy and before the Ranji Trophy. Chandigarh competed in the Vijay Hazare Trophy for the first time. Mumbai were the defending champions.

Seventeen out of the first thirty matches that were scheduled to be played across all four groups were abandoned or finished in a no result. Therefore, the Board of Control for Cricket in India (BCCI) issued a revised schedule for the rain-affected matches. The statistics for cancelled matches were revoked leading to Rongsen Jonathan missing out on his maiden hundred in List A cricket. On 12 October 2019, in the Group A match between Kerala and Goa, Kerala's Sanju Samson scored the fastest double century in List A cricket. It was the highest individual total in the Vijay Hazare Trophy, with an unbeaten 212 runs from 129 balls. It was also the highest total made by a wicket-keeper in a List A cricket match.

Following the conclusion of matches played on 10 October 2019, Gujarat and Tamil Nadu, both from Group C, were the first two teams to qualify for the knockout stage of the tournament. After the final group matches, Chhattisgarh, Delhi, Karnataka, Mumbai and Punjab finished in the top five places across groups A and B. They were joined by Pondicherry in the knockout stage, who finished top of the Plate Group.

In the first quarter-final match, Group A winners Karnataka beat Pondicherry, who won the Plate Group, by eight wickets. The second quarter-final saw Gujarat beat Delhi by six wickets by the VJD method, after a brief rain delay. The remaining two quarter-final matches both finished in a no result due to rain. As a result, Chhattisgarh advanced over Mumbai and Tamil Nadu advanced over Punjab, after Chhattisgarh and Tamil Nadu had won more matches in the group stage of the competition.

The first semi-final saw Karnataka beat Chhattisgarh by nine wickets, with ten overs to spare, after Devdutt Padikkal scored 92 runs. In the second semi-final, the match was delayed due to a wet outfield, and eventually shortened to 40 overs per side. Tamil Nadu went on to beat Gujarat by five wickets, with Shahrukh Khan making an unbeaten fifty, to advance to the final. Karnataka won a rain-affected final, beating Tamil Nadu by 60 runs, with Abhimanyu Mithun taking a hat-trick.

Teams and format
The teams were placed in the following groups. Chandigarh competed in the tournament for the first time. The tournament retained the same format as the previous edition of the competition. The tournament had four groups, with nine teams each in Groups A, B and ten teams in Group C and the Plate Group. The top two teams from Group C and the top team in the Plate Group progressed to the quarter-finals of the tournament, along with the top five teams across Groups A and B.

Group A
 Andhra
 Chhattisgarh
 Goa
 Hyderabad
 Jharkhand
 Karnataka
 Kerala
 Mumbai
 Saurashtra

Group B
 Baroda
 Delhi
 Haryana
 Himachal Pradesh
 Maharashtra
 Odisha
 Punjab
 Uttar Pradesh
 Vidarbha

Group C
 Bengal
 Bihar
 Gujarat
 Jammu & Kashmir
 Madhya Pradesh
 Railways
 Rajasthan
 Services
 Tamil Nadu
 Tripura

Plate Group
 Arunachal Pradesh
 Assam
 Chandigarh
 Manipur
 Meghalaya
 Mizoram
 Nagaland
 Pondicherry
 Sikkim
 Uttarakhand

League stage

Group A

Group B

Group C

Plate Group

Knockout stage

Quarter-finals

Semi-finals

Final

References

External links
 Series home at ESPN Cricinfo

Vijay Hazare Trophy
Vijay Hazare Trophy
Vijay Hazare Trophy